Elysius cingulata is a moth of the family Erebidae. It is found on Jamaica and in South America, including Brazil, Paraguay and Argentina.

References

Moths described in 1856
cingulata
Moths of South America